Morpheis votani is a moth in the family Cossidae. It was described by Schaus in 1934. It is found in Argentina.

References

External Links 
Natural History Museum Lepidoptera generic names catalog

Zeuzerinae
Moths described in 1934